Palace of Deceit is a video game written by Cliff Bleszinski in 1991 in his own company Game Syndicate Productions at the age of 16. The first edition subtitled The Secret of Castle Lockemoer was a text adventure for MS-DOS. On August 31, 1992, it was remade for Windows 3.x and subtitled The Dragon's Plight as a graphical point-and-click adventure game with an entirely new plot and graphics. Both games are played in a first-person perspective and have been released as freeware. Bleszinski's inspiration came from video games like Déjà Vu and Uninvited.

The Secret of Castle Lockemoer
In the original game, the player has the role of a man from the future brought to the medieval past by a good wizard to enter the castle Lockemoer and destroy the Evil Wizard. The game is a text adventure which uses occasional graphics which are created using ASCII.

The Dragon's Plight
In this remake, the player has the role of the dragon Nightshade, who has been captured by the evil wizard Garth and thrown into the dungeons. Nightshade seeks a way out of the castle and a way to destroy Grath for his campaign to wipe out dragonkind from the land of Salac. The game is a point-and-click adventure which has some similarities to Shadowgate and Déjà Vu, but it entirely lacks music and sound. Nightshade can die in certain encounters, forcing the player to restart or reload a save file. The game was coded in Visual Basic and the graphics created using Microsoft Paintbrush.

References

External links

1991 video games
1992 video games
Adventure games
DOS games
DOS-only games
Video games developed in the United States
Windows games
Windows-only games